University of Life is an idiomatic phrase meaning the (sometimes painful) education one gets from life's usually negative experiences.

University of Life may also refer to:

Life University, in USA
University of Life Theater and Recreational Arena, their sports arena
University of Life Sciences in Lublin, in Poland
University of Life Sciences in Poznań, in Poland
University of Life Sciences in Wroclaw, in Poland